Dickinson, also known as Quincy, is an unincorporated community in Kanawha County, West Virginia, United States. The community is served by U.S. Route 60.

The community was named after John Quincy Dickinson, the original owner of the town site.

References

Unincorporated communities in Kanawha County, West Virginia
Unincorporated communities in West Virginia
Coal towns in West Virginia
Populated places on the Kanawha River